Live at the Opera House is the first live album released by the American vocal group The Pointer Sisters, released on the Blue Thumb label in 1974.

History
The album became a milestone for the group.  They became the first contemporary pop group to perform at San Francisco's Opera House.  The album peaked at number 96 on the Billboard 200 and reached number 29 on the R&B albums chart.  The album was remastered and issued on CD in 2006 by Hip-O Select.

Track listing

Personnel
Anita Pointer, Ruth Pointer, Bonnie Pointer, June Pointer – vocals
Chris Michie – guitar
Thomas P. Salisbury – piano, Hohner clavinet, organ
John Newmann – bass
Gaylord Birch – drums, congas

Production
David Rubinson & Friends, Inc. – producer, mix-down engineer
Fred Catero – associate producer, recording engineer, mix-down engineer
David Coffin, Greg Odell, Valerie Clausen, Stephen Jarvis, Ken Hopkins – recording engineers
George Horn, Phil Brown – mastering engineer
Tom Salisbury – conductor, arrangements
Tom Wilkes – graphics
Ren Deaton – photography

Charts

References

External links
 

1974 live albums
The Pointer Sisters albums
Albums produced by Dave Rubinson
Blue Thumb Records live albums